Salah Al-Marzouq (born 9 March 1970) is a Kuwaiti handball player. He competed in the 1996 Summer Olympics.

References

External links
 

1970 births
Living people
Handball players at the 1996 Summer Olympics
Kuwaiti male handball players
Olympic handball players of Kuwait
Asian Games medalists in handball
Handball players at the 2002 Asian Games
Asian Games silver medalists for Kuwait
Medalists at the 2002 Asian Games